National Route 51 is a four-lane highway starting from the city of Biên Hòa to Vũng Tàu in the Southeast region of Vietnam, passing Bình, Long Thành, Bà Rịa town. This is the backbone route linking Bà Rịa–Vũng Tàu province with Đồng Nai province and Ho Chi Minh City. With a total length of 85.6 km , with of 15 to 23 km, this road includes 15 bridges, going through several important industrial parks of the Principal Economic Area of South Vietnam, an area which includes province in Southeast region.  The towns along this road include: Long Thành (where Long Thanh International Airport is under construction), Tam An Town, Nhơn Trạch City, Phú Mỹ (an important electricity hub of Vietnam). This national road starts from the roundabout in Biên Hòa city, 20 km northeast of Saigon Bridge of Ho Chi Minh City.

51